WOW 1996 is a compilation album of thirty contemporary Christian music that was released on November 7, 1995.  This represented the first installment in a highly successful annual series named WOW Hits.  The album peaked at No. 144 on the Billboard 200 chart in 1995.  It also landed in seventh place on Billboard's Top Contemporary Christian album chart that year, and reached second place in 1996.  The album was certified as platinum in the year 1997 by the Recording Industry Association of America (RIAA).

Track listing

Disc one
 "Cry for Love" – Michael W. Smith
 "Children of the World" – Amy Grant
 "Heaven in the Real World" – Steven Curtis Chapman
 "God is In Control" – Twila Paris
 "Count It All Joy" – BeBe & CeCe Winans
 "Stand" – Susan Ashton
 "I Wish We'd All Been Ready" – dc Talk
 "The Great Divide" – Point of Grace
 "For Future Generations" – 4Him
 "Deep Calling Deep" – Margaret Becker
 "His Love Is Comin' Over Me" – Clay Crosse
 "When Love Comes To Life" – Out of the Grey
 "Common Creed" – Wes King
 "True Believers" – Phil Keaggy
 "No Doubt" – Petra

Disc two
 "Build My World Around You" – Sandi Patty 
 "Don't Look Away" – Bryan Duncan
 "Sweet Days of Grace" – Cindy Morgan
 "Biggest Part of Me" – Take 6
 "Go Light Your World" – Kathy Troccoli
 "Send Out a Prayer" – Anointed
 "Brother's Keeper" – Rich Mullins
 "Home Run" – Geoff Moore & the Distance
 "Great Lengths" – PFR
 "Shine" – Newsboys
 "Step of Faith" – Carman
 "Concert of the Age" – Phillips, Craig & Dean
 "The Class of '95" – Wayne Watson
 "The Anchor Holds" – Ray Boltz
 "Taking My Time" – Ashton, Becker & Denté

References

External links 
 WOW Hits online

1995 compilation albums
1996